The 2004 United States House of Representatives elections in New Jersey were held on November 2, 2004 to determine who will represent the people of New Jersey in the United States House of Representatives. This election coincided with national elections for U.S. President, and the U.S. House and U.S. Senate. There was no concurrent election for Senator or Governor in the state. New Jersey has thirteen seats in the House, apportioned according to the 2000 United States Census. Representatives are elected for two-year terms.

Overview

District 1 
 

Incumbent Democrat Rob Andrews won. This district covers Camden County.

District 2 
 

Incumbent Republican Frank A. LoBiondo defeated Democrat Timothy Robb. This district covers the southern part of the state.

District 3 
 

Incumbent Republican Jim Saxton defeated Democrat State Assemblyman Herb Conaway. The district covers Burlington and Ocean counties.

District 4 
 

Incumbent Republican Chris Smith defeated Democrat Amy Vasquez. This district covers 4 counties in the central part of the state.

District 5 
 

Incumbent Republican Scott Garrett defeated Democrat Dorothea Anne Wolfe. This district covers the northern border of the state.

District 6 
 

Incumbent Democrat Frank Pallone defeated Republican Sylvester Fernandez. This district covers mostly Monmouth and Middlesex counties.

District 7 
 

Incumbent Republican Mike Ferguson defeated Democrat Steve Brozak. This district covers 4 counties in the northern part of the state.

District 8 
 

Incumbent Democrat Bill Pascrell defeated Republican George Ajjan. This district covers Essex and Possaic counties.

District 9 
 

Incumbent Democrat Steve Rothman defeated Republican Edward Trawinski. This district covers mostly Bergen county.

District 10 
 

No Republican challenged incumbent Democrat Donald M. Payne for this seat. Only minor parties also contested the election. This district covers a heavily urbanized area, which includes the city of Newark.

District 11 
 

Incumbent Republican Rodney Frelinghuysen defeated Democrat James Buell. This district covers mostly Morris county.

District 12 
 

Incumbent Democrat Rush Holt defeated Republican Bill Spadea. This district covers 5 suburban counties in the central part of the state.

District 13 
 

Incumbent Democrat Bob Menendez defeated Republican Richard Piatkowski. This heavily urbanized district.

References 

2004 Election Results

New Jersey

2004 New Jersey elections
2004